Jakob Alešovec (24 July 1842, Skaručna – 17 October 1901, Ljubljana) was an ethnic Slovene-Austrian writer and playwright. Until 1866, Alešovec wrote in German, but later switched to Slovenian. He wrote travelogues, tales, folk plays, and satires, as well as the first Slovenian detective story.

Works 
 Iz sodnijskega življenja (1875) – From the Judges Life
 Kako sem se jaz likal (1884) – How I Was Ironing Myself

References

Further reading
 Veliki slovenski leksikon, Mladinska knjiga (2003)

External links

1842 births
1901 deaths
19th-century Carniolan writers
19th-century Austrian male writers
19th-century poets
Carniolan dramatists and playwrights
Carniolan poets
German-language writers
People from the Municipality of Vodice